is a passenger railway station located in the city of Kasama, Ibaraki Prefecture, Japan operated by the East Japan Railway Company (JR East). The station is also a freight depot for the Japan Freight Railway Company (JR Freight).

Lines
Tomobe Station is served by the Jōban Line, and is located 98.8 km from the official starting point of the line at Nippori Station. It is also the official terminus of the 50.2 km Mito Line.

Station layout
The station consists of one side platform and two island platforms, connected to the station building by a footbridge. The station has a Midori no Madoguchi ticket office. All the "Tokiwa" trains on the Jōban Line stop at this station. Except during the day, Mito line trains operate directly to Mito/ Katsuta on the Jōban line. During the daytime, two regular trains and one limited express train stop every hour, making it possible to access Tokyo and Shinagawa without having to transfer.

Platforms

History
Tomobe Station was opened on 1 January 1895. The station was absorbed into the JR East network upon the privatization of the Japanese National Railways (JNR) on 1 April 1987. A new station building was completed in 2007.

Passenger statistics
In fiscal 2019, the station was used by an average of 3531 passengers daily (boarding passengers only).

Surrounding area
 Kasama City Hall
Tomobe Post Office
Ibaraki Central Hospital

See also
 List of railway stations in Japan

References

External links

  Station information JR East Station Information 

Railway stations in Ibaraki Prefecture
Jōban Line
Mito Line
Railway stations in Japan opened in 1895
Kasama, Ibaraki
Stations of Japan Freight Railway Company